This is a list of rural localities in Khakassia. Khakassia (Russian: Хакасия; Khakas: Хакасия), officially the Republic of Khakassia (Russian: Республика Хакасия, tr. Respublika Khakasiya, pronounced [rʲɪˈspublʲɪkə xɐˈkasʲɪjə]; Khakas: Хакас Республиказы, tr. Xakas Respublikazı), is a federal subject (a republic) of Russia. Its capital city is Abakan, which is also the largest city in the republic. As of the 2010 Census, the republic's population was 532,403.

Altaysky District 
Rural localities in Altaysky District

 Bely Yar

Askizsky District 
Rural localities in Askizsky District:

 Abramov
 Askiz
 Poltakov

Beysky District 
Rural localities in Beysky District:

 Beya

Bogradsky District 
Rural localities in Bogradsky District:

 Abakano-Perevoz
 Bograd

Ordzhonikidzevsky District 
Rural localities in Ordzhonikidzevsky District

 Kopyovo

Shirinsky District 
Rural localities in Shirinsky District:

 Shira

Tashtypsky District 
Rural localities in Tashtypsky District:

 Tashtyp

See also 

 
 Lists of rural localities in Russia

References 

Khakassia